Epideira multiseriata is a species of sea snail, a marine gastropod mollusk in the family Horaiclavidae.

Description

Distribution
This marine species occurs in the Persian Gulf, Sri Lanka and the China Sea.

References

 Li B.Q., Kilburn R.N., & Li X.Z. (2010). Report on Crassispirinae Morrison, (Mollusca: Neogastropoda: Turridae) from the China Seas. Journal of Natural History. 44, 699-740.

External links
 Smith E.A. (1877). Diagnoses of new species of Pleurotomidae in the British Museum. Annals and Magazine of Natural History. ser. 4, 19: 488-501.

multiseriata
Gastropods described in 1877